Sam Windsor (born 12 June 1987) is an Australian professional rugby union player who currently plays as a fly-half for the Rugby New York (Ironworkers) in Major League Rugby (MLR).

Professional rugby

Windsor joined the Brumbies Academy in Canberra in 2008, before playing with English club Blackheath for two seasons from 2010 to 2012.

He played for NSW Country Eagles in the inaugural season of the National Rugby Championship in 2014, and signed a one-year contract to play for Ulster in 2015–16.

References

External links
 Sam Windsor stats on It's Rugby

1987 births
Living people
Australian expatriate rugby union players
Australian expatriate sportspeople in the United States
Expatriate rugby union players in the United States
Houston SaberCats coaches
Houston SaberCats players
New South Wales Country Eagles players
Rugby union fly-halves
Rugby union players from New South Wales
Ulster Rugby players
Australian rugby union players
Rugby New York players